Eamonn Loughran (born 5 June 1970) is an Irish former professional boxer who competed from 1987 to 1996. He held the WBO welterweight title from 1993 to 1996, successfully defending the title five times. At regional level he held the Commonwealth welterweight title from 1992 to 1993.

Amateur career
As an amateur, Loughran boxed  for Ireland and won a silver medal at the 1987 AIBA Youth World Boxing Championships in Havana, Cuba defeating the Cuban and American fighters on the way to the final. Loughran then turned professional later that year.

Professional career
Loughran fought out of the Breen Gym in Belfast and, in December 1987, fought his first professional fight at the Ulster Hall, Belfast, County Antrim, Northern Ireland, in which he beat Glaswegian Adam Muir on a card that included Dave "Boy" McAuley and Andy Holligan.

It was five years, during which he fought twenty professional fights, before Loughran challenged for his first title belt.

Loughran is a former Commonwealth Light Welterweight Title holder and won the WBO Welterweight Title and lost on his sixth defence in the first round to José Luis Lopez in March 1996 after which Loughran announced his retirement.

Post retirement
Loughran never returned to the ring, or to boxing, after the defeat to Lopez. He now lives in his native Ballymena.

References

External links
 

1970 births
Living people
Sportspeople from Ballymena
Male boxers from Northern Ireland
World Boxing Organization champions
Irish male boxers
Welterweight boxers